Mesopodagrion is a genus of flatwings in the damselfly order Odonata. There are two described species in Mesopodagrion.

As a result of molecular phylogenetic studies by Bybee et al. in 2021, it is now in its own family, Mesopodagrionidae.

Species
 Mesopodagrion tibetanum McLachlan, 1896
 Mesopodagrion yachowensis Chao, 1953

References

Calopterygoidea
Zygoptera genera